Shindig is a technology platform for large scale online video chat events.

History 
Shindig was created by Steve Gottlieb in 2009. In 2009, Gottlieb filed a number of patents for self-aggregated chat. Beta build of the platform was launched in June 2012. In 2010, the company raised $5MM in financing from the Pritzker/Vlock family office.

In 2013, the company won the SIAA's Innovation Incubator Award as the Educator's Choice Runner-Up for Education Technology Product or Service.

See also
 Spreecast

References

Online chat